Indooroopilly railway station is located on the Main line in Queensland, Australia. It serves the Brisbane suburb of Indooroopilly. Immediately south of the station, the line crosses the Brisbane River via the Albert Bridge.

History
Indooroopilly station opened on 14 June 1875 as Witton. It was renamed Indooroopilly in 1879. The line through Indooroopilly was duplicated in June 1886.

The station was rebuilt in 1960 as part of the quadruplication of the line. In July 2007, a project began to upgrade the station. It was completed in January 2009.

Services
Indooroopilly is served by City network services operating from Nambour, Caboolture, Kippa-Ring and Bowen Hills to Springfield Central, Ipswich and Rosewood.

Services by Platform

*Note: One weekday morning service (4:56am from Central) and selected afternoon peak services continue through to Rosewood.  At all other times, a change of train is required at Ipswich.

References

External links

Indooroopilly station Queensland Rail
Indooroopilly station Queensland's Railways on the Internet

Railway stations in Brisbane
Railway stations in Australia opened in 1875
Main Line railway, Queensland
Indooroopilly, Queensland